Raraju ( King of the King) is a 2006 Indian Telugu-language action film produced by on S.S.P. Arts banner and directed by Udayasankar. It Gopichand, Meera Jasmine, and Ankitha. K.S. Chithra makes a guest appearance in the movie. The music was composed by Mani Sharma.

The film was later dubbed into Hindi as Ek Qayamat in 2007.

Plot
Kaali is an ordinary man who arranges lighting and mike sets for local functions, including marriages and public meetings. He is kindhearted and also tough when it comes to recovering dues. Everyone in the colony simultaneously fears and loves. An SI of the area is always after Kaali and repeatedly says that she is in love with him, but he did not care. At this juncture, a girl called Jyothi joins the colony. She ekes out her living by singing the chorus in film songs. When some goons try to attack her, she warns her that she is Kaali's girl. Like that, she enters into his life. Kaali thinks she loves him and loses his heart to her. On one occasion, Kaali learns her past. Surya, who is the son of a peon, wants to become an IAS officer. Surya and Jyothi could not appear for the IAS examination due to a crooked police officer Kotireddy Venkat Reddy who tries to implicate them in a brothel case. As a result, Jyothi's stepmother throws her away from their house, and she gets shelter in Surya's house. They both fall in love with each other. Unfortunately, Surya dies in an accident, but he continues to live in Jyothi's heart. On learning this, Kaali decides to help her in fulfilling Jyothi's ambition and makes her an IAS officer. In the process, he also teaches a lesson to Reddy. In the climax, Surya's parents force Jyothi to marry Kaali. When everything is ready, Kaali decides not to marry her as Surya is still in her heart.

Cast

Gopichand as Kaali
Meera Jasmine as Jyothi
Ankitha
Sivaji as Surya
Ashish Vidyarthi as Kotireddy Venkat Reddy
Chandra Mohan as Surya's father
Jaya Prakash Reddy
Gundu Hanumantha Rao 
M.S. Narayana 
Sumitra
Venu Madhav  
Chittajalu Lakshmipati 
K.S.Chitra in a cameo as herself
Junior Relangi 
Malladi Raghava 
Ranam Venu 
Fish Venkat 
Apoorva 
Alapathi Lakshmi 
Kavya

Soundtrack

Music composed by Mani Sharma. Music released on ADITYA Music Company.

References

Indian action films
Films scored by Mani Sharma
2006 action films
2006 films
Films directed by Udayasankar